Kenneth Leslie McAuley (January 9, 1921 – June 18, 1992) was a Canadian professional ice hockey goaltender who played 96 games in the National Hockey League with the New York Rangers during the 1943–44 and 1944–45 seasons.

Playing career
McAuley played for the New York Rangers, who experienced a shortage of players due to the World War II draft. After serving a year in the military, McAuley was signed by the Rangers and played two seasons with the club. With a record of 17–64–15 he was not re-signed following the war. The Rangers opted to rotate Charlie Rayner and Jim Henry in net.

While playing in all but 20 minutes of the 1943-44 season, McAuley allowed 310 goals, setting a league record for worst goals against average (6.24) that has stood ever since. The closest any starting goaltender has come to breaking this record is Greg Millen, who recorded a 4.81 GAA as the Hartford Whalers starting goaltender in the 1982-83 season.

Career statistics

Regular season and playoffs

References

External links
 

1921 births
1992 deaths
Canadian expatriates in the United States
Canadian ice hockey goaltenders
Canadian military personnel of World War II
Edmonton Flyers (WHL) players
Kimberley Dynamiters players
New York Rangers players
Ice hockey people from Edmonton